Parliamentary elections were held in Hungary on 28 and 29 May 1939. The result was a victory for the Party of Hungarian Life, which won 181 of the 260 seats in Parliament (72 percent of the parliament's seats) and won 49 percent of the popular vote in the election. Pál Teleki remained Prime Minister.  
This was a major breakthrough for the far-right in Hungary; between them, far-right parties were officially credited with 49 seats and 25 percent of the vote.

This was the closest thing to a free election that Hungary had seen at that point. According to historian Stanley G. Payne, the far right bloc would have almost certainly won more seats had the election been conducted in a truly fair manner, and possibly garnered an "approximately equal" seat count and vote share with the Party of Hungarian Life.

Electoral system
The electoral system was changed from that used in 1935. The number of single-member constituencies was reduced from 199 to 135, whilst the number of multi-member constituencies was raised from 11 to 38. Additionally, the franchise had been significantly expanded, with all men over 26 and all women over 30 now allowed to vote.

Results

The total number of registered voters was 4,629,493, but only 4,355,778 voters were registered in contested seats.

By constituency type

Notes

References

Hungary
Elections in Hungary
Parliamentary
Hungary

hu:Magyarországi országgyűlési választások a Horthy-rendszerben#Az 1939-es választások